The 2013–14 AIK IF season was AIK's 30th season in the Swedish Hockey League (formerly known as Elitserien), the top division in Sweden. 

2013–14 SHL season
2013-14